Frogham  may refer to:

Frogham, Hampshire, United Kingdom
Frogham, Kent, United Kingdom